The Martin Ennals Award for Human Rights Defenders, sometimes called "the Nobel Prize for human rights", is an annual prize for human rights defenders. It was created in 1993 to honour and protect individuals around the world who demonstrate exceptional courage in defending and promoting human rights. Its principal aim is to provide protection ("protective publicity") to human rights defenders who are at risk by focusing international media attention on their plight, mainly through online means and advocacy work. The Award is named after British human rights activist Martin Ennals, former secretary general of Amnesty International and a Nobel Peace Prize laureate.

The Award carries an important financial prize intended to support the Award winners' work in the field of human rights. The Award ceremony, co-hosted with the City of Geneva, takes place in the first semester of the year. The Jury, composed of representatives of ten of the world's leading human rights organisations, selects the Award winner each year. Members of the jury include Amnesty International, Human Rights Watch, International Federation of Human Rights, World Organisation Against Torture, Front Line Defenders, International Commission of Jurists, Human Rights First, International Service for Human Rights, Brot für die Welt, and Huridocs.

Recipients

References

External links 
 Martin Ennals Award website

Human rights awards
Awards established in 1993